North Bergen was a railroad station in North Bergen, New Jersey, United States known Homestead for most of its existence. It as built in the mid 19th century and served by the New York, Susquehanna and Western Railway (#1059) and the Erie Railroad's Northern Branch (#1903).

The station was located at the foot of the Bergen Hill at Paterson Plank Road west what is now Tonnele Avenue. The village then known as Homestead lay on western slope of lower Hudson Palisades below Schuetzen Park. The abutting village of New Durham was to the north; an eponymous station was located at what is now 50th Street adjacent to North Bergen Yard and the present day terminus of the Hudson–Bergen Light Rail at Tonnelle Avenue. Babbitt, the northernmost station in the township, was at 83rd Street.

The right of way was originally developed by the Paterson and Hudson River Railroad (Erie) in the 1850s. The New Jersey Midland, a predecessor of the New York, Susquehanna and Western Railway (NYSW), built its line to its terminus a West End Junction circa 1873 and had trackage rights south of that point. Passenger service on the line was discontinued in 1966.

The station house was demolished, as were most others along Northern Branch, though former station buildings along the line at Englewood, Tenafly, Demarest, Closter, and Piermont still stand. Extant station buildings from the New Jersey Midland/NYSW can be found at Wortendyke, Butler, and Newfoundland, among other places.

The rail line is still used for freight transport by CSX as part of the Conrail Shared Assets Area and the NYSW mainline.

See also 
 Timeline of Jersey City, New Jersey-area railroads
 NYSW (passenger 1939–1966) map
 Northern Branch map
 Operating Passenger Railroad Stations Thematic Resource

References 

North Bergen, New Jersey
Railway stations in the United States opened in 1872
Railway stations in Hudson County, New Jersey
Former railway stations in New Jersey
Former Erie Railroad stations
Former New York, Susquehanna and Western Railway stations